Telocytes are a type of interstitial (stromal) cells with very long (tens to hundreds of micrometres) and very thin prolongations (mostly below the resolving power of light microscopy) called telopodes.

Rationale for the term telocyte 

Professor Laurențiu M. Popescu's group from Bucharest, Romania described a new type of cell. Popescu coined the terms telocytes (TC) for these cells, and telopodes (Tp) for their extremely long but thin prolongations in order to prevent further confusion with other interstitial (stromal) cells (e.g., fibroblast, fibroblast-like cells, myofibroblast, mesenchymal cells). Telopodes present an alternation of thin segments, podomeres (with caliber mostly under 200 nm, below the resolving power of light microscopy) and dilated segments, podoms, which accommodate mitochondria, (rough) endoplasmic reticulum and caveolae - the so-called "Ca2+ uptake/release units". The concept of TC was promptly adopted by other laboratories, as well.

Telocytes and/or fibroblasts ? 

The interstitium (stroma) is in most of the cases seen as a connecting "device" for the specific structures of an organ. Usually, people perceive interstitial cells as being mainly (or even, only) fibroblasts. However, fibroblasts have the function of generating connective tissue matrix, specifically, collagen. The distinction between TC and fibroblasts is obvious since they have different ultrastructure and phenotype. Therefore, their functions should be mostly different: TC - intercellular signaling (connections), but fibroblasts - collagen synthesis. In other words, TC are "more" functionally oriented while fibroblasts are "more" structurally oriented, responsible for fibrosis.

There are some clear ultrastructural features that differentiate telocytes from fibroblasts. For instance, the general aspect of TC is of a small oval (piriform/spindle/triangular/stellate)-shaped cellular body, containing a nucleus surrounded by a small amount of cytoplasm. Anyway, the shape of the cell body depends on the number of Tp. TC cellular body average dimensions are, as measured on EM images, 9.3 μm ± 3.2 μm (min. 6.3μm; max. 16.4 μm).  Fibroblast nucleus is typically euchromatic, but TC nucleus is mostly heterochromatic. Mitochondria represent only 2% of cell body volume and the Golgi complex is small in TC. Fibroblasts Golgi complex is prominent and the rough endoplasmic reticulum is very well developed (usually 5-12%) of cell volume.

Since telopodes are distinctive for telocytes, here are their main features:
 Number: 1–5 (frequently only 2–3 telopodes are observed on a single section, depending on site and angle of section, since their 3D convolutions prevent them to be observed at their full length in a 2D very thin section);
 Length: tens – up to hundreds of μm, as measured on EM images (e.g. Figs. 2-10). However, under favorable conditions in cell cultures, their entire length can be captured in several successive images (Fig. 1);
 Thickness: uneven caliber, mostly below 0.2 μm (below the resolving power of light microscopy), visible under electron microscopy;
 Moniliform aspect: podoms and podomeres; average caliber of podomeres: 0.1 μm ± 0.05μm, min. = 0.003 μm; max. = 0.24 μm;   Podoms accommodate: mitochondria, (rough) endoplasmic reticulum, caveolae, a trio called ‘Ca2+-uptake/release units’.
 Branching, with a dichotomous pattern;
 Organization in a labyrinthine system, forming a 3D network anchored by hetero- and homocellular junctions.

Summary 

Here is shown visual evidence (electron microscopy, electron tomography, phase contrast microscopy) for the existence of Telocytes (TC) in many organs from human and rodents. TC and Tp, and also podoms and podomeres were found in:
 cavitary organs:
 heart (endo-, myo-, and pericardium);
 stomach and intestine, with mesentery;
 gall bladder;
 uterus and Fallopian tube;
 non-cavitary organs:
 lungs and pleura;
 pancreas (exocrine gland);
 mammary gland;
 placenta;
 kidneys;

Recent evidence shows the involvement of TC in pathology. TC are strategically located in between blood vessels (capillaries), nerve endings and the specific resident cell populations of a given organ. TC establish via Tp homo- and heterocellular junctions and release shed vesicles and exosomes.

Perspectives: regenerative medicine 

TC and SC make a tandem (due to specific intercellular junctions) within the so-called SC niches, at least in heart and lungs. Hence, TC could be key-players in regenerating and repair of some organs. The tandem TC-SC could be a better option for therapy rather than SC alone. Published studies suggest that cardiac TCs could be regarded as a potential cell source for therapeutic use to improve cardiac repair and function after a myocardial infarction, either alone or in tandem with SC. Recent data show that TCs are completely different from FBs, using a quantitative proteomics approach, suggesting that TCs might play specific roles in mechanical sensing and mechanochemical conversion task, tissue homoeostasis and remodelling/renewal.

Figures

See also
List of human cell types derived from the germ layers
Interstitial cell of Cajal, a similar, and potentially equivalent, cell

References 

Human cells